Charles Thomas George Brodie (22 February 1937 – 24 April 2000) was a Scottish professional football goalkeeper who made 400 appearances in The Football League, most notably for Brentford, Aldershot and Northampton Town. His professional career came to an end in 1970, when he was seriously injured after a dog ran onto the field of play. The dog ran into Brodie's knee after he grabbed the ball, which the dog was chasing. Brodie suffered severe ligament damage.

Career

Manchester City 
Born in Duntocher, Brodie began his career with Junior clubs Duntocher Hibernian and Partick Avondale. He joined Manchester City of the Football League First Division as an amateur in March 1954. He spent four years with the club, playing understudy to the popular German goalkeeper Bert Trautmann, but failed to break into the first team and departed in July 1957.

Gillingham 
Brodie dropped down the leagues to join Gillingham of the Third Division South in July 1957. He spent one season with the Kent-based club, during which he played 22 times.

Aldershot 
Brodie joined Fourth Division club Aldershot in July 1958. At the time he was completing his National Service and was stationed in the town. He remained at the Recreation Ground until February 1961 and departed having made 106 appearances for the club.

Wolverhampton Wanderers 
Brodie secured a move back to the top-flight when he joined Wolverhampton Wanderers for a then-club record £9,000 in February 1961. He played just one league match for Wolves, before departing Molineux in September 1961.

Northampton Town 
Brodie dropped back down to the Third Division to join Northampton Town in September 1961, for £4,000. His first appearance for the club meant that he made three consecutive appearances for three clubs. Brodie played regularly for the club for just over two years and won a Third Division championship medal during the 1962–63 season. He departed the County Ground in November 1963, having made 97 appearances for the Cobblers.

Brentford 
Brodie moved to London to join Third Division club Brentford in November 1963 in a £10,000 deal. He quickly usurped long-standing regular goalkeeper Gerry Cakebread and was the Bees' regular goalkeeper until losing his place to Gordon Phillips during an injury-affected 1966–67 season. He regained his place in the team early in the 1970–71 season, but on 27 November 1970, a dog ran onto the field of play during a match away to Colchester United and impacted Brodie's leg after he had picked the ball up, damaging ligaments in his knee. Though he managed five further appearances during the second half of the season, the injury ended Brodie's professional career. Brodie departed Griffin Park at the end of the 1970–71 season, after making 224 appearances during his eight years with the Bees. He was posthumously inducted into the Brentford Hall of Fame in 2015.

Non-League football 
In 1971 Brodie resumed playing, albeit at a semi-professional level, with Southern League Premier Division club Margate. He remained with the Gate for two seasons and was in goal when the team lost 11–0 to Bournemouth in an FA Cup match in November 1971. He later played for Wealdstone and Maidstone United before retiring from football.

International career 
Brodie represented Scotland at Schoolboy and Junior level.

Personal life 
Prior to becoming a professional footballer, Brodie served a five-year apprenticeship in electrical engineering. In his latter years as a professional footballer, Brodie became a London taxi driver and as of September 1995 was living in Southall. He died in 2000 at the age of 63, after suffering with prostate cancer.

Career statistics

Honours 
Northampton Town

 Football League Fourth Division: 1962–63

Brentford

 London Challenge Cup: 1966–67

Individual

Brentford Supporters' Player of the Year (2): 1964–65, 1965–66
 Brentford Players' Player of the Year (1): 1969–70
 Brentford Hall of Fame

References

1937 births
2000 deaths
Scottish footballers
Manchester City F.C. players
Gillingham F.C. players
Aldershot F.C. players
Wolverhampton Wanderers F.C. players
Northampton Town F.C. players
Brentford F.C. players
Margate F.C. players
Wealdstone F.C. players
Footballers from West Dunbartonshire
Association football goalkeepers
English Football League players
Southern Football League players
Maidstone United F.C. (1897) players
Deaths from prostate cancer
Scotland youth international footballers
Scotland junior international footballers
Duntocher Hibernian F.C. players
Deaths from cancer in England